The 1959 Labour Party deputy leadership election took place on 4 May 1959, after sitting deputy leader Jim Griffiths retired.

Candidates
 Aneurin Bevan, Shadow Foreign Secretary, Member of Parliament (MP) for Ebbw Vale

Sources
http://privatewww.essex.ac.uk/~tquinn/labour_party_deputy.htm 

1959
Labour Party deputy leadership election
Labour Party deputy leadership election
Labour Party deputy leadership election